Estakhrha (also Romanized as Estakhrhā; also known as Estakhrū’īyeh) is a village in Khabar Rural District, in the Central District of Baft County, Kerman Province, Iran. At the 2006 census, its population was 60, in 13 families.

References 

Populated places in Baft County